In the archaeology of Neolithic Europe, the burned house horizon is the geographical extent of the phenomenon of presumably intentionally burned settlements.

This was a widespread and long-lasting tradition in what are now Southeastern Europe and Eastern Europe, lasting from as early as 6500 BCE (the beginning of the Neolithic in that region) to as late as 2000 BCE (the end of the Chalcolithic and the beginning of the Bronze Age). 
A notable representative of this tradition is the Cucuteni-Trypillian culture, which was centered on the burned-house horizon both geographically and temporally.

There is still a discussion in the study of Neolithic and Eneolithic Europe whether the majority of burned houses were intentionally set alight or not.

Although there is still debate about why the house burning was practiced, the evidence seems to indicate that it was highly unlikely to have been accidental. There is also debate about why this would have been done deliberately and regularly, since these burnings could destroy the entire settlement. However, in recent years, the consensus has begun to gel around the "domicide" theory supported by Tringham, Stevanovic and others.

Cucuteni-Trypillian settlements were completely burned every 75–80 years, leaving behind successive layers consisting mostly of large amounts of rubble from the collapsed wattle-and-daub walls. This rubble was mostly ceramic material that had been created as the raw clay used in the daub of the walls became vitrified from the intense heat that would have turned it a bright orange color during the conflagration that destroyed the buildings, much the same way that raw clay objects are turned into ceramic products during the firing process in a kiln. 
Moreover, the sheer amount of fired-clay rubble found within every house of a settlement indicates that a fire of enormous intensity would have raged through the entire community to have created the volume of material found.

Evidence
Although there have been some attempts to try to replicate the results of these ancient settlement burnings, no modern experiment has yet managed to successfully reproduce the conditions that would leave behind the type of evidence that is found in these burned Neolithic sites, had the structures burned under normal conditions.

There has also been a debate between scholars whether these settlements were burned accidentally or intentionally. Whether the houses were set on fire in a ritualistic way all together before abandoning the settlement, or each house was destroyed at the end of its life (e.g. before building a new one) it is still a matter of debate.  The first theory, holding that the burning of the settlements was due to reasons resulting from accident or warfare, originated in the 1940s, and referred only to some of the Cucuteni-Trypillian sites located in Moldova and Ukraine (& Paul 1967). The second theory that holds that the settlements were burned deliberately is more recent, and broadens the focus to include the entire region of the culture, and even beyond (McPherron and Christopher 1988; Chapman 2000; and Stevanovic 1997).

Although the phenomenon of house burning is pervasive throughout the Cucuteni-Trypillian culture's existence, it was by no means the only southeastern European Neolithic society that experienced this. The British-American archaeologist Ruth Tringham has coined the term Burned House Horizon to describe the extent of the geographical region that indicates this repetitive practice of house burning in southeast Europe. She, along with Serbian archaeologist Mirjana Stevanović, mapped out this phenomenon from archaeological sites throughout the entire region, and came to the conclusion that:

Although I have referred to the ubiquity of burned building rubble in south-east European Neolithic settlements as the burned house horizon (Tringham 1984; 1990), it is clear from Stevanović's, Chapman's and my own analyses, that 'the burned house horizon' is neither a chronologically nor regionally homogenous phenomenon (Chapman 1999; Stevanović 1996, 2002; Stevanović and Tringham 1998). For example early Neolithic houses have more artifacts deposited in them, and it is in these early Neolithic phases that burned human remains are most likely to occur (Chapman 1999). Human remains occur again in the late Eneolithic (Gumelniţa/Karanovo VI). The presence or absence of human remains in the rubble of burned houses is clearly of great significance.

Although the practice of house burning took place among a handful of different Neolithic cultures in southeast Europe, it is most widely known among the Cucuteni-Trypillian culture for a number of reasons:
 The Cucuteni-Trypillian culture had the largest settlements in history up to their time.
 There is evidence that every single settlement in this culture probably practiced house burning.
 This culture practiced house burning for a longer period of time (1600 years), and for a later date (up to 3200 BC), than any of the other cultures.
 The Cucuteni-Trypillian culture was considered by some scholars to be the largest and most influential of the Neolithic cultures of eastern Europe during the transition to the Eneolithic period.

Accident vs. intentional debate
Accidental fire argument:
Some of the burned sites contained large quantities of stored food that was partially destroyed by the fires that burned the houses. Additionally, there was a high risk of fire due to the use of the primitive ovens in these homes. These two facts support the theory that the buildings were burned accidentally or due to enemy attack, as it could be argued that nobody would intentionally burn their food supplies along with their homes.

Intentional fire argument:
Some historians claim that settlements were intentionally burned in a repeated cycle of construction and destruction. Serbian archeologist Mirjana Stevanovic writes: "… it is unlikely that the houses were burned as a result of a series of accidents or for any structural and technological reasons but rather that they were destroyed by deliberate burning and most likely for reasons of a symbolic nature".

Some of the modern house-burning experiments include those done by Arthur Bankoff and Frederick Winter in 1977, Gary Shaffer in 1993, and Stevanovic in 1997. In their experiment, Bankoff and Winter constructed a model of a partially dilapidated Neolithic house, and then set it on fire in a way that would replicate how an accidental fire would have perhaps started from an untended cooking-hearth fire. They then allowed the fire to burn unchecked for over thirty hours. Although the fire rapidly spread to the thatched roof, destroying it in the process, in the end less than one percent of the clay in the walls was fired (turned into ceramic material), which is counter to the large amount of fired-clay wall rubble that is found in the Cucuteni-Trypillian settlement ruins. Additionally, the experimental burning left the walls almost entirely intact. It would have been relatively easy for the roof to have been repaired quickly, the ash cleared away, and the house reoccupied. These results are typical for all of the modern experiments that have been done to try to recreate these ancient house burnings. Stevanovic, an expert archeological ceramicist, describes how in order to produce the large amount of fired clay rubble found in the ruins, that enormous quantities of extra fuel would have had to be placed next to the walls to create enough heat to vitrify the clay.

Theories
An analysis of the possibilities for why the Cucuteni-Trypillian settlements burned periodically produces the following theories:

References

External links
Cucuteni Culture The French Government's Ministry of Culture's page on Cucuteni Culture (in English).

Neolithic Europe
Copper Age Europe
Archaeology of Bulgaria
Archaeology of Kosovo
Archaeology of Moldova
Archaeology of Romania
Archaeology of Serbia
Archaeology of Slovakia
Archaeology of Ukraine
Cucuteni–Trypillia culture
Building and structure fires in Europe